Atalanta was launched at Newcastle-upon-Tyne in 1811. She initially sailed as a government transport, sailing to the Indian Ocean. She also captured an American vessel after the outbreak of war with the United States. She then became a West Indiaman, and later traded with Sierra Leone and Madeira. She made one voyage to Bombay, sailing under a licence from the British East India Company (EIC). She was broken up circa 1831.

Career
Atalanta first appeared in Lloyd's Register (LR) in 1812.

In December 1812 the transport Atalanta, Davidson, master, sent into the Cape of Good Hope the American whaler Ocean, of Nantucket. On 29 June Atalanta arrived at the Cape from Mauritius.

In 1813 the EIC had lost its monopoly on the trade between India and Britain. British ships were then free to sail to India or the Indian Ocean under a licence from the EIC. Captain W.Johnson sailed for Bombay on 26 April 1826.

Fate
LR for 1832 carried the annotation "Broke up" by Atalantas name.

Notes, citations, and references
Notes

Citations

References
 

1811 ships
Ships built on the River Tyne
Age of Sail merchant ships of England